Jagoš Vuković (born 10 June 1988) is a Serbian professional footballer who plays as a defender.

Vuković earned eight caps for Serbia from 2009 to 2017.

Club career
Born in Bačko Dobro Polje, a municipality of Titov Vrbas, Vuković started in Red Star Belgrade's youth academy but lack of first team opportunities prompted a move to Rad in 2006.

On 28 August 2009 it was announced that Vuković would be loaned to PSV Eindhoven, with the prospect of a permanent signing at the end of the season. Vuković made his official debut for PSV on 22 October 2009, in the UEFA Europa League match against Copenhagen, coming on as a substitute for Erik Pieters in the 86th minute of the game. On 22 November 2009, Vuković made his Eredivisie debut in the league game against Heracles Almelo, coming on as a substitute for Erik Pieters in the 77th minute of the game, to only 10 minutes later score his first official goal for PSV with a stunning left-footed long range shot from 21 yards. On 9 April 2010 Vuković, who was playing for PSV on loan from Rad, has signed a three-year deal with the Dutch club.

On 31 August 2013, he made his return to Serbia and signed a two-year contract with Serbian SuperLiga side Vojvodina. On 7 January 2014 he signed with Süper Lig club Konyaspor.

On 13 July 2017, Vuković signed with Greek club Olympiacos. He made only five appearances with the Reds during the first half of the 2017–18 season and was clearly not in the first-team plans of their Spanish manager, Óscar. On 23 January 2018 Vuković moved to Italian club Verona until the end of the season. In the summer of 2018, Vuković returned to Olympiacos and started the season as a first defensive choice for Olympiacos new coach Pedro Martins. On 25 November 2018, he scored with the head his first goal with the club, in the last minute of the game by Kostas Fortounis’ free-kick against rivals Atromitos giving a vital 2–1 away win in his club's effort to win the championship. On early September he terminated his contract with Olympiakos.

On 28 February 2020, Vuković signed with Chinese club Qingdao Huanghai.

International career
Vuković was a member of the Serbia under-21 team at the 2009 UEFA European Under-21 Championship. He also played for the Serbia under-19 team at the 2007 UEFA European Under-19 Championship.

Career statistics

Club

International

Honours 
Konyaspor
Turkish Cup: 2016–17

References

External links
 
 
 

1988 births
Living people
People from Vrbas, Serbia
Association football defenders
Serbian footballers
Serbia international footballers
Serbia under-21 international footballers
Red Star Belgrade footballers
FK Rad players
PSV Eindhoven players
Roda JC Kerkrade players
FK Vojvodina players
Konyaspor footballers
Olympiacos F.C. players
Hellas Verona F.C. players
Qingdao F.C. players
First League of Serbia and Montenegro players
Serbian First League players
Serbian SuperLiga players
Eredivisie players
Süper Lig players
Super League Greece players
Serie A players
Chinese Super League players
Serbian expatriate footballers
Serbian expatriate sportspeople in the Netherlands
Serbian expatriate sportspeople in Turkey
Serbian expatriate sportspeople in Greece
Serbian expatriate sportspeople in Italy
Serbian expatriate sportspeople in China
Expatriate footballers in the Netherlands
Expatriate footballers in Turkey
Expatriate footballers in Greece
Expatriate footballers in Italy
Expatriate footballers in China